Lamen (Lamenu, Varmali) is an Oceanic language spoken on Epi Island, in Vanuatu.

External links 
 Materials on Lamenu are included in the open access Arthur Capell collections (AC1 and AC2) held by Paradisec.

References

Epi languages